Ghost Orchard is the stage name of  American lo-fi musician Sam Hall. Hall is from Grand Rapids, Michigan.

History
Hall began making music when he was in high school. In 2015, he self-released an album titled Poppy, before being re-released in 2016 by the record label Orchid Tapes. Hall released his second full-length album, Bliss, in 2016 through Orchid Tapes. In 2019, Hall released his third full-length album on Orchid Tapes titled Bunny.

Influences
Hall cites Ricky Eat Acid, Katie Dey, Spencer Radcliffe, Blithe Field, Foxes In Fiction, and Alex G as influences.

Discography

Studio albums
Poppy (self-released, 2015; Orchid Tapes, 2016)
Bliss (2016, Orchid Tapes)
Bunny (2019, Orchid Tapes)
invisible string (2022, Winspear)
rainbow music (2022, Winspear)

References

Living people
Musicians from Grand Rapids, Michigan
Lo-fi musicians
American pop musicians
21st-century American musicians
Year of birth missing (living people)